Sir Hugh Muir Nelson,  (31 December 1833 – 1 January 1906) was Premier of Queensland from 1893 to 1898.

Early life
Hugh Nelson was born at Kilmarnock, Scotland, the son of  William Lambie Nelson. Hugh was educated at the Edinburgh High School, and began a promising course under Sir William Hamilton at Edinburgh University. This was cut short when he went with his father to Queensland in 1853 and settled at Ipswich. Hugh Nelson obtained a position in a mercantile house, and then took up a pastoral life about six miles out of Ipswich. He then went to the Darling Downs to manage a station, and in 1870 married Janet, daughter of Duncan McIntyre. Afterwards Nelson took up Loudon station in the Dalby district.

His father, William Lambie Nelson, was elected to the first Queensland parliament in 1860 but was unseated because he was a minister of religion.

Politics 

In 1880, when the divisional boards act came in, Hugh Nelson was elected a member of the Wambo board. His strong personality and cultivated intellect soon led to his being appointed chairman of the board. He was elected to the Legislative Assembly of Queensland for Northern Downs on 7 September 1883, and after the 1887/8 redistribution of seats, he was member for Murilla (28 April 1888 to 13 April 1898). In June 1888 he became secretary for railways in the McIlwraith ministry and held the same position when Morehead succeeded McIlwraith. When Griffith became premier, Nelson was elected leader of the opposition, but when Griffith resigned in March 1893 to become chief justice, Nelson formed a coalition with McIlwraith taking the portfolios of treasurer and vice-president of the executive council. In October he became premier in a ministry which lasted four and a half years, for the last three years of which he was also chief secretary.

He was created K.C.M.G. in 1896 and was appointed to the privy council at the time of his visit to England during the diamond jubilee celebrations in 1897.

Nelson did most valuable work as treasurer during the depression which followed the financial crisis of 1893. In April 1898 when the Byrnes ministry came in, Nelson became president of the Queensland Legislative Council, and in 1903 lieutenant-governor, for both of which positions his fine appearance, tact and grace of manner eminently fitted him.

Nelson had an intimate knowledge of men, and was an excellent parliamentarian with a good grasp of constitutional matters and a keen understanding of financial questions. His genial nature made him personally popular and though scarcely an orator, his practical common sense always made him worthy of attention. He was opposed both to the separation movement in Queensland and to federation. He showed himself to be a strong man during the shearers' strike of 1894, but his best work was done as treasurer when he led the colony out of a state of financial chaos.

Later life 
Nelson died at Toowoomba on 1 January 1906, survived by Lady Nelson, two sons and three daughters. He was accorded a State funeral, and was buried in Drayton and Toowoomba Cemetery.

Notes

References

1833 births
1906 deaths
Premiers of Queensland
Australian Presbyterians
Knights Commander of the Order of St Michael and St George
Australian members of the Privy Council of the United Kingdom
Scottish emigrants to colonial Australia
People from Kilmarnock
People from Ipswich, Queensland
Presidents of the Queensland Legislative Council
Treasurers of Queensland
Burials in Drayton and Toowoomba Cemetery
19th-century Australian politicians
Alumni of the University of Edinburgh